I Am the Golden Gate Bridge is the first album by rock band Creature with the Atom Brain. It was released in 2008 on the Munich Records label.

Track listing
 "The Psychedelic World of the Creature With the Atom Brain"   
 "16 Inch Revolver"
 "Black Out, New Hit"
 "Mind Your Own God"
 "Is That Lady Sniff?"   
 "Broken Flowers Grow"
 "Not a Sect"
 "Blackened Roses, Same Ol' Doses"
 "Park My Car Outside the Record Store"
 "Rapeman's Scalp"
 "Crawl Like a Dog"
 "I'm Gonna Roll"

Creature with the Atom Brain albums
2008 albums